The Design District is a shopping area in Calgary, Alberta, Canada, centered on 11th Avenue S.W.

References

Neighbourhoods in Calgary